Avrora may refer to:
Russian cruiser Aurora (Avrora), a Russian protected cruiser; currently a museum ship in St. Petersburg
Avrora, Russian feminine name; a variant of Aurora
Avrora, former name of Hirkan, a village in Lankaran District, Azerbaijan
Avrora (album), 2007 album by the Russian band Leningrad
Avrora (magazine), a Soviet literary magazine published in Leningrad; first to publish Roadside Picnic by brothers Strugatsky
Avrora (train), express train which derailed in 1988
Mobile OS Aurora (also romanized as "Avrora"), a Russian operating system spun off from Sailfish